Donald Oliver Corbitt (April 1, 1924 – September 3, 1993) was an American football offensive lineman in the National Football League for the Washington Redskins.  He played college football at the University of Arizona and was drafted in the 28th round of the 1948 NFL Draft.

1924 births
1993 deaths
American football centers
Arizona Wildcats football players
People from Creston, Iowa
Players of American football from Iowa
Washington Redskins players